Joseph Tidd (born 1960) is a British physicist and Professor of technology and innovation management at Science Policy Research Unit. He is the editor of the International Journal of Innovation Management.

Books

References

External links
Personal website
Tidd at Sussex

Living people
21st-century British physicists
Academics of the University of Sussex
Innovation economists
1960 births
Business and management journal editors
Management scientists
Alumni of the University of Sussex